Lega Lombarda – Alleanza Nord (Lombard League – Northern Alliance) was an electoral alliance for the 1989 European Parliament election in Italy.

It was composed by six regionalist parties representative of six Northern regions:
Lega Lombarda
Liga Veneta
Piemont Autonomista
Uniun Ligure
Lega Emiliano-Romagnola
Alleanza Toscana

The alliance won 1.8% of the votes and two MEPs: Francesco Speroni and Luigi Moretti, both of Lega Lombarda. The six parties started a founding process which led to the birth of Lega Nord (Northern League) in February 1991. In three years Alleanza Nord/Lega Nord quintupled its share of vote, reaching 8.7% in the 1992 general election.

Alleanza Nord
Defunct political party alliances in Italy